Aldisa albomarginata is a species of sea slug, a dorid nudibranch, a marine gastropod mollusk in the family Cadlinidae.

Distribution
This species was described from two specimens found at 7 m and 10 m depth at Earls Cove, British Columbia, Canada . It is known from Vancouver, British Columbia, Canada south to San Diego, southern California, USA.

References

Cadlinidae
Gastropods described in 1984